Pine Lakes is an unincorporated community and census-designated place (CDP) in Lake County, Florida, United States. The population was 862 at the 2010 census, up from 755 at the 2000 census. It is part of the Orlando–Kissimmee Metropolitan Statistical Area.

Geography
Pine Lakes is located in northeastern Lake County. The CDP includes the communities of Pine Lakes, South Pine Lakes, and Florida Hills.

Florida State Road 44 passes through Pine Lakes, leading northeast  to DeLand and southwest  to Mount Dora.

There are at least eight named lakes in the CDP, the largest being Pine Lake and Crystal Lake.

Demographics

As of the census of 2000, there were 755 people, 282 households, and 205 families residing in the CDP. The racial makeup of the CDP was 96.95% White, 0.93% African American, 0.40% Native American, 0.13% Asian, 0.93% Pacific Islander, 0.40% from other races, and 0.26% from two or more races. Hispanic or Latino of any race were 2.78% of the population.

There were 282 households, out of which 34.4% had children under the age of 18 living with them, 48.9% were married couples living together, 13.5% had a female householder with no husband present, and 27.0% were non-families. 20.6% of all households were made up of individuals, and 10.3% had someone living alone who was 65 years of age or older.  The average household size was 2.68 and the average family size was 2.94.

In the CDP, the population was spread out, with 27.9% under the age of 18, 8.3% from 18 to 24, 27.5% from 25 to 44, 22.1% from 45 to 64, and 14.0% who were 65 years of age or older.  The median age was 36 years. For every 100 females, there were 106.3 males.  For every 100 females age 18 and over, there were 104.5 males.

The median income for a household in the CDP was $28,333, and the median income for a family was $26,250. Males had a median income of $28,194 versus $23,889 for females. The per capita income for the CDP was $11,232.  About 29.5% of families and 32.4% of the population were below the poverty line, including 55.9% of those under age 18 and 15.2% of those age 65 or over.

References

Census-designated places in Lake County, Florida
Greater Orlando
Census-designated places in Florida